Union Station is a historic building in Northampton, Massachusetts, that served as a train station from 1897 until 1987. Built at the close of the nineteenth century, the structure incorporates many features of the Richardsonian Romanesque architectural style. The buff brick masses of the station are trimmed with red Longmeadow brownstone and hooded by red tile roofs. Steep dormers protrude from the roofline. The interior once featured Italian marble floors, oak woodwork, and a large fireplace.

The building, which is privately owned, was converted in 2013 into a 200-seat banquet facility, a sports bar, and a facility known as the Tunnel Bar that runs underneath the building.

On December 29, 2014, Amtrak's Vermonter began stopping at a new passenger rail boarding platform located just to the south of the Union Station building. A pilot program added two daily round trips of the Valley Flyer in August 2019.

Railway history

Former service

The Connecticut River Railroad opened to passenger service between Springfield and Northampton in late 1845; trains reached Deerfield in August 1846, Greenfield in December 1847, and the junction with the Central Vermont Railway in January 1849. When the Vermont and Massachusetts Railroad reached Brattleboro in 1850, the Connecticut River Railroad began running through service from Springfield to Brattleboro. Over the next century, the line was host to a mix of local and long-distance passenger and freight service. It became part of the route for numerous New York-Montreal trains as early as the 1860s, and was acquired by the Boston and Maine Railroad in 1893.

Northampton's Union Station was built in 1896-97 during a project to eliminate grade crossings through downtown Northampton. The station unified two separate stations, serving the Connecticut River mainline, the Central Massachusetts Railroad, the New Haven and Northampton Railroad, and the NH&N's Williamstown Branch. The station opened on Sunday morning December 5, 1897, in time for the departure of the 9:25 a.m. train for Springfield. It was reported that upwards of 2,000 people visited the station on its opening day.

The station was heavily damaged by fire in the early morning hours of October 31, 1928.  The fire, which was visible for miles up and down the valley, is said to have attracted a large crowd of late Halloween revelers.  Service quickly resumed and the station was rebuilt.

Long-distance passenger service over the line ended in October 1966, with local service between Springfield and Brattleboro lasting several more months. In 1972, Amtrak began running the Montrealer, which ran along the line at night, stopping at Northampton but not Holyoke or Greenfield. The Montrealer was discontinued in 1987 due to poor track conditions on the line.

Montrealer service resumed in 1989 after Amtrak seized control of the line in Vermont from the Boston and Maine Railroad, but the train was rerouted over the Central Vermont Railway through Massachusetts and Connecticut to avoid the still-dilapidated Conn River Line which Amtrak did not control. A stop was added at Amherst to replace Northampton. The Montrealer was replaced by the daytime Vermonter in 1995, using the original route through Connecticut but still avoiding the Connecticut River Line in Massachusetts.

The former station building, associated 200-space parking lot, and the Tunnel Bar that operates under the building in the under-track passage, were purchased by the business entities Harmonic Rock LLC and Notch 8 Inc. in 2013 for $2.55 million. The current owners have added a new 200-seat banquet facility called Union Station Banquets and a bar called the Platform Sports Bar.

Restoration of service

In order to shorten travel times on the Vermonter and add additional local service to serve the populated Connecticut River Valley, the Conn River Line was rebuilt with $73 million in federal American Recovery and Reinvestment Act money and $10 million in state funds.

The Vermonter was rerouted to the line on December 29, 2014, stopping at Northampton, and Greenfield. A temporary accessible platform was built at Northampton for the start of service, intended to be replaced by a permanent -long platform by the end of 2015. The permanent platform was planned to be bid in combination with an underpass connecting the Norwottuck Rail Trail (part of the Mass Central Rail Trail) with the Northampton Bikeway north of downtown. However, the underpass was bid separately in 2016. The $1.6 million project was nearly complete by mid-June.

In 2016, over 17,000 passengers boarded or alighted at the station, significantly exceeding a 2009 projection of 10,000 annual riders. On August 30, 2019, Amtrak extended two daily Amtrak-operated Hartford Line round trips (branded as Valley Flyer) to Greenfield as a pilot program.

The former station building, associated 200-space parking lot, and the Tunnel Bar that operates under the building in the under-track passage, were purchased by the business entities Harmonic Rock Realty LLC and Notch 8 Inc. in 2013 for $2.55 million. The current owners have added a new 200-seat banquet facility called Union Station Banquets and a bar called Platform Sports Bar.

References

External links

Union Station Banquets

Amtrak stations in Massachusetts
Buildings and structures in Northampton, Massachusetts
Stations along Boston and Maine Railroad lines
Stations along New York, New Haven and Hartford Railroad lines
Railway stations in the United States opened in 1897
Railway stations closed in 1987
Northampton, Massachusetts
1897 establishments in Massachusetts
1987 disestablishments in Massachusetts
Railway stations in the United States opened in 2014